(stylized in all caps) is a Japanese kawaii metal band consisting of Suzuka Nakamoto as "Su-metal" and Moa Kikuchi as "Moametal". The band is produced by Kobametal from the Amuse talent agency. Their vocals are backed by heavy metal instrumentation, performed by a group of session musicians known as the "Kami Band" at performances.

The band was formed in 2010, with the original lineup of Su-metal (vocal and dance), Moametal (scream and dance), and Yui Mizuno as "Yuimetal" (scream and dance), with the concept of creating a fusion of the heavy metal and Japanese idol genres. Originally a sub-unit of the Japanese idol group Sakura Gakuin, Babymetal became an independent act in 2013, following Nakamoto's departure from Sakura Gakuin.

Babymetal released their eponymous debut album in February 2014. Their second album Metal Resistance was released worldwide in April 2016. Babymetal has also embarked on several tours, with a majority of their tour dates taking place outside of Asia. The group released their third album Metal Galaxy in October 2019.

On October 19, 2018, Babymetal announced that Yui Mizuno had decided to leave the band due to poor health, following her absence from live performances since December 2017. Since her departure, the band has performed with backup dancers at live performances. In 2019, the band introduced three backup dancers called "Avengers" who performed in rotation at each live show to form a trio with Moametal and Su-metal.

History

2010–2012: Beginnings 
In 2009, Kobametal, the band's producer and long-time heavy metal enthusiast, started planning the launch of an idol/heavy metal fusion group after he was impressed by Suzuka Nakamoto's performance with her previous group Karen Girl's, thinking she would be suitable as the lead vocalist for the new group. According to Kobametal, Yui Mizuno and Moa Kikuchi were added to complement Nakamoto's "unique stage presence" with their smaller statures, dancing around her "like angels". None of the three members were familiar with metal music before the inception of the band.

In July 2011, Babymetal premiered the song, "Ijime, Dame, Zettai" ("No More Bullying"), at a Sakura Gakuin concert, but it would only be performed during live concerts for the time being. A music video for the song was uploaded to Toy's Factory channel on YouTube on October 12, 2011, and was released as a DVD single in late 2011, under the independent Toy's Factory sublabel Juonbu Records. The music video totaled over 1 million views by the end of 2012.

Babymetal's first CD single was a collaboration with the band Kiba of Akiba, titled "Babymetal / Kiba of Akiba". Released in March 2012 by Juonbu Records, the single ranked at number three on the Oricon weekly indie chart, and number one in the Tower Records Shibuya weekly indie ranking. In the summer of 2012, the band released a music video for their next single, "Headbangeeeeerrrrr!!!!!", directed by Hidenobu Tanabe. In August 2012, Babymetal debuted at Japan's Summer Sonic Festival, becoming the youngest act ever to perform at the festival, at the average age of 12. The same year, Babymetal performed outside of Japan for the first time at the 2012 Anime Festival Asia in Singapore.

2013–2015: Major label debut and Babymetal

On January 9, 2013, the band debuted on a major record label with "Ijime, Dame, Zettai". Released under the main Toy's Factory label and Juonbu Records, it sold 19,000 copies in its first week and debuted at number six in the Oricon Weekly Singles Chart. In the spring of 2013, Nakamoto graduated from junior high school and therefore had to "graduate" from Sakura Gakuin (a group of elementary and junior high school girls). However, their management decided that Babymetal would not dissolve and would continue its activities as a band. The group released its next single, "Megitsune", on June 19, 2013, under Toy's Factory and the band's new sublabel BMD Fox Records.

On August 10 and 11, 2013, Babymetal again took part in the Summer Sonic Festival, performing in Tokyo and Osaka. Later, in October, Babymetal also became the youngest artists ever to perform at the heavy metal music festival Loud Park. In November, Babymetal released a promo video for the Japanese premiere of Metallica's movie Through the Never, and released its first live music video Live: Legend I, D, Z Apocalypse, which debuted at seventh place in the weekly Oricon Blu-ray Disc charts, and at second place among music Blu-rays. In December, Babymetal performed at Anime Festival Asia Indonesia 2013 and performed for a second time in Singapore.

On February 26, 2014, Babymetal released its first, eponymous album. It contained thirteen tracks and was also available in a limited edition that included a DVD with music videos and live footage. The album was well received by music critics as well as the public, selling over 37,000 copies in Japan its first week, debuting at number four on the Oricon Weekly Album Chart, and number two in Billboard Japan. It also topped iTunes Metal charts in Germany, the United Kingdom and the United States, and reached number 187 on the US Billboard 200 chart on March 22. Their album also made it into the Heatseekers chart at number four. On March 1 and 2, 2014, the band gave two concerts at Budokan. With the average age of 14.7, they became youngest-ever female act to perform a show there. The two concerts were attended by 20,000 people. On April 3, 2014, an episode of the Fine Brothers' YouTubers React show was uploaded to YouTube, covering the band and the music videos of "Doki Doki Morning", "Iine!", and "Gimme Chocolate!!"; the band members' own reaction to the video would later be released in 2016.

At the end of their March 2 Budokan concert, Babymetal also announced their first world tour, the Babymetal World Tour 2014, 
initially performing in Paris and Cologne. UK's Sonisphere Festival was subsequently added to the tour, after being formally invited to play following a successful fan-driven campaign entitled "Babymetal For Sonisphere UK 2014", which Sonisphere later acknowledged on its website. After the UK leg of the tour, the band went on to make their debut appearance in the United States on July 27 with a headlining show at The Fonda Theatre in Hollywood. They played Heavy Montréal 2014 in Canada on August 9 alongside Metallica, Slayer and Anthrax; and also performed at Summer Sonic 2014 in Japan on the Mountain Stage with bands such as Avenged Sevenfold and Megadeth. Babymetal was also the opening act to five of Lady Gaga's concerts in her ArtRave: The Artpop Ball 2014 tour in August along the western United States. Babymetal also released their second live album Live: Legend 1999 & 1997 Apocalypse on October 19, 2014, featuring their live performances at both the NHK Hall and at Makuhari Messe Event Hall from 2013.

In August 2014, it was announced that the band would return to England to play another show at London's O2 Academy Brixton on November 8, their final European show of the year as part of the group's "Babymetal Apocalypse" phase. It was later announced that the band would also return to New York City, which they had visited earlier in the year without giving an actual performance, performing at the Hammerstein Ballroom on November 4. At their Brixton performance, the band debuted a new song titled "Road of Resistance." Later revealed to be a collaboration with Sam Totman and Herman Li of prominent power metal band DragonForce, the song was subsequently released as a bonus track of their first live album Live at Budokan: Red Night, released simultaneously along with the band's third live video album Live at Budokan: Red Night & Black Night Apocalypse on January 7, 2015, and later released as a digital single. Li later revealed via Twitter and Facebook posts that he and Totman had been working on the song's guitar parts since 2013. In 2015, they re-released their eponymous album via earMusic and RAL/Sony Music Entertainment. Ahead of their performance at the Metal Hammer Golden Gods Awards on June 15, the trio made a surprise appearance during DragonForce's set at Download Festival, performing "Gimme Chocolate!!", despite event organizer Andy Copping stating that he would never book the band.

2016–2017: Touring and Metal Resistance

During the band's headlining shows at Yokohama Arena in December 2015, announced a second studio album to be released on April 1, 2016, as well as a world tour starting in London at the Wembley Arena, and concluding in Japan with a debut at the Tokyo Dome. On January 15, 2016, the second album's title was revealed to be Metal Resistance.

Their second album had shown differences from their debut album. Yuimetal states that "compared to the first album and definitely the second album they challenged themselves to a lot of new, different types of genres of music, even more than before." Another difference is that there is more use of positive lyrics than ever before. The band made a point to provide a wide variety of styles to attract a wider audience and performed a full song in English.

The band came up with the album title Metal Resistance because they believed it represents who they are and what they do as Babymetal. Su-metal said that "it's about them exploring new, different aspects of what they can do."

On March 13, the band's producer, Kobametal, received an Excellence Award from the Association of Media in Digital (AMD) in Japan for his success in promoting the band internationally. On April 2, one day after the release of Metal Resistance, Babymetal became the first Japanese act to headline Wembley Arena, with the largest sale of merchandise for a single day event in the venue's history, coinciding with the highest ever entry for an album in the UK charts for a Japanese act. The Guardian gave their Wembley performance a rating of five out of five stars. On April 5, Babymetal made their U.S. television debut, performing "Gimme Chocolate!!" on The Late Show with Stephen Colbert. Babymetal were added as a character skin in the Wii U video game Super Mario Maker in 2016.

On May 26, 2016, WWE's Triple H announced on Twitter that Babymetal's song "Karate", along with A Day to Remember's "Paranoia", would be used as official theme songs of NXT TakeOver: The End. On July 18, the band made a special appearance at the Alternative Press Music Awards where they performed "Karate" before being joined onstage by Judas Priest frontman Rob Halford. Halford, along with Nakamoto and the Kami Band, performed an abridged version of "Painkiller", followed by a performance of "Breaking the Law" where they were rejoined by Mizuno and Kikuchi on guitars. On July 27, Metal Hammer readers voted Babymetal's debut album as the best album of the 21st century. In September 2016, Warner Bros. announced that a hybrid live action-animation fantasy-adventure short form series featuring the members of the band was under development. The series would be developed by Blue Ribbon Content in collaboration with Amuse Group USA (an Amuse Inc. subsidiary based in the United States). The band's producer, Kobametal, is also involved with production of the series.

On September 19 (Red Night) and September 20, 2016 (Black Night), Babymetal ended their Babymetal World Tour 2016: Legend Metal Resistance by performing at the Tokyo Dome, with both nights sold out and approximately 55,000 people attending each night. These included fans from Japan and many others from around the world. Yuimetal admitted she was "still in shock" that she was playing at the venue. Moametal felt the same, calling it "a big challenge for young girls of our age to stand on that stage". Su-metal explained that "In Japan we have played many big venues like Budokan and others, but Tokyo Dome was always a place that I have been dreaming of performing at." In December 2016, Babymetal supported the Red Hot Chili Peppers during The Getaway World Tour in the UK. During their final show on the tour, Red Hot Chili Peppers drummer Chad Smith joined Babymetal onstage to perform their covers of Judas Priest's "Painkiller" and "Breaking the Law". After the performance, Smith thanked Babymetal for being on tour with them and led the audience in singing "Happy Birthday" to Su-metal.

In January 2017, Babymetal supported Metallica for their WorldWired Tour at Gocheok Sky Dome and also appeared in Japan's performance of the Guns N' Roses' Not in This Lifetime... Tour as the opening act. In April 2017, Babymetal supported the Red Hot Chili Peppers during The Getaway World Tour in the US. In June 2017, Babymetal performed at the KISW Pain in the Grass music event in Auburn, Washington. During the summer of 2017, they supported Korn on their Serenity of Summer Tour. Afterwards, they commenced their The Five Fox Festival in Japan tour.

In October 2017, Babymetal were officially revealed as the performers of the "Unikitty Theme" for the Unikitty! TV series. On December 2 and 3, 2017, Babymetal performed at the Hiroshima Green Arena, with the shows billed Legend "S" Baptism XX. This was the first time the group performed in Su-Metal's hometown of Hiroshima, and it was an early coming of age celebration for her, since December 20, 2017 was her 20th birthday (as hinted in the show title), the age of majority in Japan; the lyrics to "Headbangeeeeerrrrr!!!!", about a girl's fifteenth birthday, were even modified for the occasion. This was also Babymetal's first performance without all three members, as Yuimetal was unable to perform due to illness.

On December 30, 2017, Kami Band guitarist Mikio Fujioka fell from an observation deck; he died from his injuries on January 5, 2018. Babymetal released a eulogy on Twitter on January 9, commemorating his work with the band.

2018–2020: The Chosen Seven era, departure of Yuimetal, Metal Galaxy

On April 1, 2018, Babymetal posted a video to YouTube entitled "Metal Resistance Episode VII – The Revelation". In the video, it is explained that a "dark side" of Babymetal exists, "with seven metal spirits", and that a "new era is about to begin". A graphic novel entitled Apocrypha: The Legend of Babymetal was also announced in the following days. Written by "the Prophet of the Fox God" and Illustrated by GMB Chomichuk, it was released on October 30 by Z2 Comics. 

On May 1, 2018, Babymetal announced that they were launching their own record label, named Babymetal Records. On May 8, just ahead of the Babymetal World Tour 2018, the band released a music video for a new single, "Distortion". Yuimetal was absent from Babymetal's tour of the United States in May 2018, with no advance warning. Amid fan speculation on Mizuno's status with the group, a representative of 5B Management, the American management company representing Babymetal, replied to an inquiry from Alternative Press Magazine by saying that "Yuimetal remains a member of the band, but she is not on this current U.S. tour." The reply also hinted about "a new narrative for the future of the band which is currently evolving" and a "storyline" that "has changed." 

Yuimetal remained absent for the rest of their tour, until their agency announced at a shareholders' meeting in June that she had been in poor health since December 2017, and was "currently recovering". On October 19, 2018, shortly before the Japan leg of the tour, the band released a new single, "Starlight". On the same day, the band officially announced Yuimetal's departure from the group. Afterward, Mizuno released a statement explaining her decision and her desire to pursue a solo career. During their tour, Babymetal also performed at Rock on the Range in Columbus, Ohio, the Download Festival in Donington Park, United Kingdom, and the Rock am Ring and Rock im Park festivals in Germany. On July 9, 2018, the band was declared champion of the Heavy Metal World Cup 2018. 

On April 1, 2019, Babymetal announced that they would be releasing their third album later that year. On May 10, 2019, the band released the single "Elevator Girl". On May 29, 2019, it was announced that Babymetal would perform at the Glastonbury Festival in England on June 30, making them the first Japanese band to play on one of the festival's main stages. Babymetal also revealed plans for their first arena concert in the United States at The Forum in Los Angeles, CA, set for October 11, 2019. The date of the concert coinceded with the release date of their third studio album, Metal Galaxy. Their performance at The Forum was compiled into a live album, Live at the Forum, released in DVD and Blu-ray formats on May 13, 2020.

On June 27 2019, Babymetal released the single "Pa Pa Ya!!", featuring Thai rapper , before their concert at Yokohama Arena the same day. The video, released on July 1, featured footage from their concert in Yokohama. It included touring member Kano Fujihira, one of three girls rotating in Yui's place - Kano Fujihira, Riho Sayashi, and Momoko Okazaki - who are known as the "Avengers". Following their performance, they announced the Metal Galaxy Wourld Tour to promote their new album, starting in September 2019, and closing out in March 2020. A scheduled performance at Clockenflap in Hong Kong in November 2019 was canceled due to the 2019–2020 Hong Kong protests. Further concerts in Asia were initially postponed on March 4 due to the COVID-19 pandemic, but were ultimately canceled in June. In April, they streamed two "Stay Home, Stay Metal" shows on YouTube during the pandemic, which consisted of footage from two prior concerts from 2016. Their performances at Makuhari Messe in January 2020 were compiled into the live album Legend – Metal Galaxy, which was released on September 9.

In October 2019, the band became the first Asian act to reach the peak of Billboard Top Rock Albums Chart. In 2020, Babymetal was featured as a guest artist on Bring Me the Horizon's EP Post Human: Survival Horror, on the song "Kingslayer".

On November 16, 2020, NHK announced that Babymetal would take part in the 71st NHK Kōhaku Uta Gassen on New Year's Eve, marking their first appearance in the competition. A poll conducted by Yahoo! Japan ahead of the airing determined that the most anticipated song of the night was Babymetal's performance of "Ijime, Dame, Zettai", with 26.3% of the vote. Participating on the red team, they won with 2,635,200 votes compared to the white team's 1,383,180 votes.

2021–present: The Other One 
The band's first retrospective album 10 Babymetal Years was released on December 23, 2020. To celebrate the 10th anniversary of the band's formation, their live videos were released in audio-only vinyl format on August 25, 2021. On October 11, 2021, the band released a cryptic video hinting a hiatus or end of the band with the message "The 3 metal spirits that have been shining since 2010, even if they were to leave Earth, would continue to shine forever in our hearts and across the Metal Galaxy. A legend turns into a myth which turns into a Living Legend… What lies ahead beyond the end of the stairway to becoming a Living Legend is something only the Fox God knows."

Babymetal announced their upcoming fourth album The Other One on October 11, 2022, which they revealed to be a concept album set to release on March 24, 2023. The lead single from the album, "Divine Attack (Shingeki)", was released on October 20, 2022. This is the first Babymetal song for which all lyrics were written by Nakamoto. The second single from the album, "Monochrome", was released on November 17 with a lyric video, a first for the band. On January 19, 2023, Babymetal released the single "Metal Kingdom", along with revealing the track list for The Other One.

On October 18, 2022, Swedish metal band Sabaton announced that Babymetal would perform at their shows for the European leg of their world tour alongside Finnish band Lordi. On January 28 and 29, 2023, Babymetal played at Makuhari Messe, marking their first live concert in nearly two years. They played a total of 13 songs, five of which were from their album The Other One. Footage from the concerts was used for the music video for "Metal Kingdom", which released on February 3, 2023. They released the song "Light And Darkness" on February 23 with an accompanying music video, which likewise consisted of footage from their concerts at Makuhari Messe. On the days prior to the release, they posted two teasers for the video to their YouTube channel.

Artistry

Musical style and lyrics 
Most of Japanese pop idols show a bright atmosphere, light music, smiles and a charming face. However, Lorraine Plourde has argued that Babymetal reminds people of a slightly darker, slightly more complex version of cuteness. The band defines its style as a new genre called "kawaii metal" ("kawaii" meaning "cute") and clarifies that it is "a mix of J-pop idol and heavy metal". The group has also been described as alternative metal, death metal, power metal, nu metal and speed metal.

Tristan Peterson of Metal Obsession remarked in his review of the band's debut album "This band was created for the demographic of 'Music that your Japanese Boyfriend/Girlfriend, who doesn't really like Metal, would enjoy.'" as well as "[Babymetal] has made metal cute without losing any of its edge."

Patrick St. Michel from Japanese music and culture site MTV 81 praises the "pure, headbang-inducing energy" of the group's live performances and describes their style as a mixture of "...seemingly disparate sounds of heavy metal and idol pop, creating music anchored both by throat-mauling screeches and cuddly choruses."

Lyrical themes found in Babymetal's music focus on real-world issues. Also, they give the message of positivity and self-empowerment with the atmosphere of their music containing less serious and playful themes. To be specific, the body image concerns of girls and women pressured by society to remain thin and also bullying, while they also sing about what it's like going to your first concert, the concept of an "ideal woman" and chocolate, subjects which critics say are a step away from typical lyrical styles used by most metal bands.

Writing for the Journal of Popular Music Studies, Sarah Keith and Diane Hughes characterized Babymetal as a "prime example of the genre of idol pop being of girls, but not for girls", exemplifying the broader J-pop trend of performative girlhood. While they remarked on the band sharing many similarities with other idol groups, they also commented on Su-metal's vocal delivery being markedly different from them, as she demonstrates a "strong voice with clear tone and a minimal amount of coloratura or embellishment". The authors noted the disparity in the band's international audiences—stemming primarily from metal communities—and their Japanese audience, consisting mostly of male idol fans. They concluded that Babymetal, among other idol groups, show girls as "an idealized figure, neither produced nor consumed by girls, but enacted by performers who are girls for the male gaze".

In an analysis of Babymetal's lyrics across their debut and sophomore albums, Babymetal and Metal Resistance, musicologist Lewis F. Kennedy commented on the contrast between their often adolescent themes and the grim aesthetics of the metal genre. He also remarked on the frequent use of wordplay in their first album, reinforcing the childish nature of the lyrics. The more extensive usage of English vocabulary in Metal Resistance Kennedy saw as an effort from the band to internationalize the themes of their album to reach a wider audience. He characterized this development as making it more "traditionally metal", which metal fans would find more authentic. He also perceived the album's overarching themes of collective resistance to be a departure from both their earlier work and more traditional idol music.

Live performances and music videos 

Su-metal is the main vocalist, credited on Babymetal's official site with vocals and dancing, while Moametal and Yuimetal are credited with scream and dance, performing on either side of her in a triangle formation. In the band's early years, the band members did not speak directly to the audience, or smile at the crowd, but over time the band has incorporated more audience engagement and call and responses into their performances. Between songs, Babymetal does not engage with the crowd. Instead, there is a blackout, or, in situations where that is not possible, they will freeze in a pose or turn away from the crowd. Babymetal's costumes take a variety of cues from the popular Japanese Gothic and Punk Lolita styles, with an emphasis on red and black.

During the 2018 World Tour, due to Yuimetal's absence, the band performed with Moametal and Su-metal in front of one another, using risers to separate, while two backup dancers perform at the sides of the stage. Since her official departure, the traditional triangle formation has been restored, with a non-singing backup dancer performing in Yuimetal's place.

Instead of the sign of the horns, the band uses the hand gesture of the kitsune to symbolise the band's supposed divine inspiration. Initially, the band members were shown photos of the sign of the horns, but mistook it for the head of a fox. Rather than correct the error, the management accepted the kitsune sign as the band's sign.

In their concerts, Babymetal are accompanied by a backing band. In their early stages, the backing band consisted of the "Babybones"—a group of nameless individuals dressed in skeleton costumes that would mime live performances while pre-recorded studio tracks were being used. In late 2012, Babymetal debuted a live band for their live performances which they referred to as "Full Metal Band" - a group of live musicians dressed in white robes and corpse paint. They have since been referred to by band members and fans as "Gods of Metal" and more recently "Kami Band". From late 2012 to early 2014, the two groups would alternate, with the Kami Band being used more for festival appearances and special events. At the Babymetal Death Match Tour in May 2013, the Kami Band performed all music live for the first time. As of early 2014, the Babybones band has been quietly retired, and the Kami Band has since been established as Babymetal's primary backing band.

The Kami Band has consisted of a rotating line-up of different musicians since its debut in late 2012. As of early 2018, however, the line-up has been relatively stable, consisting of guitarists Takayoshi Ohmura, Leda, and Isao, bassist Boh, and drummer Hideki Aoyama with guitarists occasionally substituting for one another if needed. Kami Band member Leda has contributed to Babymetal's music, most notably on their album Metal Resistance (credited as Ledametal).

Babymetal's music videos, which showcase their distinct visual aesthetic, have helped the band gain broad attention. Their video for "Gimme Chocolate!!" went viral in 2014 with USA Todays Brian Mansfield commenting that the "video looks like some kind of bizarre animé, with a dark-goth set and band members playing in skeleton costumes, and the three girls execute intricate choreography, flash heart signs and make windmill arm motions like they're playing air guitar"

In regards to their music video for the song "Karate", Moametal said that she's "very proud that they are now representing this culture that came from Japan through their music, and it's a way for more people outside of Japan to also learn what karate is all about." The lyrics talk about never giving up and moving forward. Yuimetal stated that the choreography for the song represented the lyrics and that "it's important to be able to express the messages that they want to put across through the music with their dance moves." The majority of their lyrics are in Japanese and they see their choreography as a way to break the language barrier.

Public image
According to Kei "Kobametal" Kobayashi, the band's executive producer, the band was formed under the idea of a new type of metal, and the members of the band receive "divine messages" from the Fox God, though Nakamoto explained that the messages received were indirect, as they would be sent to Kobametal first. He stated that it was up to the people's decision to accept or reject the idea. Additionally, he rejected the notion of the band being a "metal" or "pop" act, preferring "the one and only Babymetal." Kikuchi joked that the three members did not decide to join the band, as it was a destiny chosen by the Fox God, whose goal is said to have the band perform and spread their music all over the world.

The band has received varied reception by the public. Some critics praised the band for being "creative" and "rule-breaking" in the metal genre, while others called the band a "novelty group" and a "silly balancing act". When asked about people who do not consider the band's pop-infused music "metal", Nakamoto acknowledged the claims and praised such accusations, warranting how metal purists have their own preferences for metal being a certain way, and taking them into consideration for the band's progress.

The fanbase, collectively referred to as "The One", has been noted by Mizuno to be a mixed demographic of varying age. Noting the fans of metal and pop, she described the "metalheads" who look like themselves, and the pop fans who dress and cosplay as them. She further emphasized the importance of being able to reach out to younger music fans branching out to the metal genre via Babymetal, noting her own lack of experience of metal before joining the band.

On December 10, 2013, Babymetal released "Babymetal Apocalypse", an incomplete binder that would be gradually filled with pages intermittently made available later. Pages would include the lore of Babymetal, artwork and photos, and information on member-exclusive events, like "Apocrypha" during the Babymetal World Tour 2014. By purchasing the binder and entering a code included with the enclosed art book online, one could join the band's official fanclub called "Babymetal Apocalypse Web". A video uploaded to "Babymetal Apocalypse Web" members in December 2014 announced the transition to a new official fanclub called "The One", which started with limited edition releases for Live at Budokan: Red Night & Black Night Apocalypse, and would continue to release member-exclusive media with news published to the official fansite.

 Legacy 
Babymetal is credited for creating the kawaii metal ("cute metal" in English) genre, which combines elements from J-pop and heavy metal. This genre has introduced metal to new audiences, and many new kawaii metal bands have formed since Babymetal's debut. While most kawaii metal bands are based in Japan, the genre has begun to spread outside the country to places like South Korea, where kawaii metal bands like Pritz have formed. Furthermore, the reach of Babymetal's influence has stretched far beyond Japan. In 2016 Babymetal became the highest-charting Japanese band ever in the UK's Official Charts history with the release of their album Metal Resistance. In the US, Metal Resistance was the first Japanese album to chart in the Billboard Top 40 in over 50 years, where it reached #39 in its first week. The last Japanese artist to break the Top 40 was Kyu Sakamoto in 1963. In 2019 Babymetal became the first Asian act to top the Billboard Rock Albums chart with the release of their third studio album Metal Galaxy.

Reception

Japan
Yūzō Kayama, a famous musician, actor and songwriter in Japan, said of the song "Gimme Chocolate!!", "I think it's hard to sing, but the pitch of the song is accurate. The rhythm is new, there are some Japanese points, the dance is innovative, and it's crisp." Reiko Yukawa, a well-known music critic in Japan, stated, "Babymetal is pretty cute with singing and dancing, they have charisma like Himiko, and glittering that no one can replace."

Yoshiki, leader of rock group X Japan, stated, "I really liked the idea of the fusion of cute girls and metal", adding "someday (X Japan can play with Babymetal)". Burrn! editor-in-chief Hirose said they were "welcome as a completely new entertainment from Japan in the UK regardless of whether it is heavy metal or not." Burrn!'s Naomiyuki Umezawa felt that Babymetal "stares metal in the face" and "creates extremely precise sounds which attracts fans and requires admiration".

Abroad
The Daily Dot wrote, "for those of us whose musical tastes fall somewhere in the middle, Babymetal is kind of like a magical, leather-clad, fire-breathing, sonic unicorn." According to Britain's The Guardian, "This is Japanese pop music, created behind-the-scenes by some fiendish Machiavellian genius who almost certainly had a sudden 'Eureka!' moment in the middle of the night and realised that Japanese audiences were certain to unquestioningly embrace such a seemingly incongruous mish-mash of cutting-edge musical ideas."

The Los Angeles Times stated, "Babymetal is a Japanese concept group, and they're the most divisive thing in heavy music right now." MetalSucks stated, "Babymetal isn't metal. It's theater, the Japanese pop industry deconstructing post-millennial metal and modern pop tropes and reconstituting them into a fully realized, 360-degree entertainment experience." After Judas Priest's Rob Halford performed with Babymetal in July 2016, he stated, "Babymetal is the future of metal."

 Members 

Only the names of the core members of Babymetal are published officially.Core members Su-metal (Suzuka Nakamoto) – lead vocals, and dancer (2010–present)
 Moametal (Moa Kikuchi) – lead/background vocals, and dancer (2010–present)Kami Band Takayoshi Ohmura – guitar (2013–present)
 Leda Cygnus – guitar (2013–present)
 Isao Fujita – guitar (2015–present)
 Boh – bass (2013–present)
 Hideki Aoyama – drums (2013–present)
 Anthony Barone – drums (2019–present)
 Chris Kelly – guitar (2019–present)
 CJ Masciantonio – guitar (2019–present)
 Clint Tustin – bass (2019–present)Avengers Riho Sayashi – backup dancer (2019–2020)
 Kano Fujihira – backup dancer (2019–2020)
 Momoko Okazaki – backup dancer (2019–present)Past members Yuimetal (Yui Mizuno) – lead/background vocals, and dancer (2010–2018)
 Mikio Fujioka – Kami Band; guitar (2013–2018; died 2018)Other musicians Hidefumi Usami – programmer (2012–?)
 Shin – drums (2012)
 Ryo – bass (2012)
 Shiren – guitar (2012)
 Hiroki Arai – guitar (2012)
 Ikuo – bass (2013)
 Shinichi Kobayashi – guitar (2013)
 Shuki Maeda – Kami Band; drums (2013)
 Miz – Kami Band; violin (2013)
 Kado Shuntaro – Kami Band; drums (2013, 2017)
 Yuya Maeta – Kami Band; drums (2014)
 Yasutaka Nomura – Kami Band; guitar (2014)
 Isamu Takita – Kami Band; bass (2017)
 Eiji Matsumoto – Kami Band; drums (2018)
 Yusuke Hiraga – Kami Band; guitar (2018-2019)Other dancers Minako Maruyama – backup dancer (2018)
 Minami Tsukui – backup dancer (2018)
 Shōko Akiyama – backup dancer (2018)
 Saya Hirai – backup dancer (2018)
 Kotono Ōmori – backup dancer (2018)Timeline'''

Discography

 Babymetal (2014)
 Metal Resistance (2016)
 Metal Galaxy (2019)
 The Other One (2023)

Tours

 Babymetal World Tour 2014 (2014)
 Babymetal Back to the USA / UK Tour 2014 (2014)
 Babymetal World Tour 2015 (2015)
 Babymetal World Tour 2015 in Japan (2015)
 Babymetal World Tour 2016: Legend Metal Resistance (2016)
 Babymetal US Tour 2017 (with Korn and Stone Sour) (2017)
 The Five Fox Festival in Japan (2017)
 Big Fox Festival in Japan (2017)
 Babymetal World Tour 2018 (2018)
 Metal Galaxy World Tour (2019–2020)

Awards and nominations

|-
| rowspan=2|2014
| rowspan=2|Babymetal
| 2014 MTV Europe Music Awards — Wild Card for Best Japanese Act
| 
|-
| NEO Awards 2014 — Best Musical Act
| 
|-
| rowspan=12|2015
| Babymetal| 7th CD Shop Awards — Grand Prix
| 
|-
| rowspan=10|Babymetal
| Loudwire 4th Annual Music Awards — Best New Artist of the Year Award
| 
|-
| Kerrang! Awards 2015 — Spirit of Independence Award
| 
|-
| Metal Hammer Golden Gods Awards 2015 — Breakthrough Award
| 
|-
| 2015 MTV Europe Music Awards — Best Japanese Act
| 
|-
| 2015 MTV Video Music Awards Japan — Best Metal Artist
| 
|-
| GQ Men of the Year 2015 Award, Special Prize "Discovery of the year"
| 
|-
| Vogue Japan Women of the Year 2015
| 
|-
| NEO Awards 2015 — Best Musical Act
| 
|-
| Loudwire 5th Annual Music Awards — Most Devoted Fans of 2015
| 
|-
| Loudwire 5th Annual Music Awards — Best Live Act of 2015
| 
|-
| "Road of Resistance"
| Loudwire 5th Annual Music Awards — Best Metal Song of 2015
| 
|-
| rowspan=9|2016
| rowspan=2|Metal Resistance|Loudwire — Most Anticipated Release of April 2016
| 
|-
| 2016 MTV Video Music Awards Japan — Best Album of the Year -Japan-
| 
|-
| rowspan=2|"Karate"
| 2016 MTV Video Music Awards Japan — Best Metal Video (Japan)
| 
|-
| 2016 MTV Video Music Awards Japan — Best Group Video (Japan)
| 
|-
| rowspan=5|Babymetal
|Kerrang! Awards 2016 — Best Live Band
| 
|-
|Metal Hammer Golden Gods Awards 2016 — Best International Band
| 
|-
| 2016 Alternative Press Music Awards — Best International Band
| 
|-
| 2016 AIM Independent Music Awards — Best Live Act
| 
|-
| Revolver Music Awards 2016 — Best New Talent
| 
|-
| rowspan=7|2017
| rowspan=2|Metal Resistance| Loudwire 6th Annual Music Awards — Best Metal Album of 2016
| 
|-
| Loudwire 6th Annual Music Awards — Best Metal Song of 2016 - "Karate" (music video)
| 
|-
| rowspan=5|Babymetal
| Loudwire 6th Annual Music Awards — Rock Goddess of the Year 2016 — "Su-metal"
| 
|-
| Loudwire 6th Annual Music Awards — Best Live Act 2016 — "Babymetal"
| 
|-
| Loudwire 6th Annual Music Awards — Most Devoted Fans 2016
| 
|-
| Loudwire 7th Annual Music Awards — Most Dedicated Fans 2017
| 
|-
| 2017 MTV Europe Music Awards — Best Japan Act
|
|-
| rowspan=7|2020
| rowspan=5|Metal Galaxy''
| 2020 MTV Video Music Awards Japan — Best Album Of The Year
| 
|}

See also
List of J-pop concerts held outside Asia

References

External links

 
 

 
Sakura Gakuin
2010 establishments in Japan
Child musical groups
Japanese musical duos
Japanese girl groups
Japanese idol groups
Japanese pop music groups
Japanese rock music groups
Japanese heavy metal musical groups
Kawaii metal musical groups
Heavy metal duos
Kerrang! Awards winners
Musical groups established in 2010
Musical groups from Tokyo
Amuse Inc. artists
Toy's Factory artists
Female musical duos
Women in metal